Nadogo F.C. is a Fijian football team playing in the second division of the Fiji Football Association competitions. It is based in Wainikoro, which is a situated on the island of Vanua Levu.

Their uniform includes olive green shirt.

See also 
 Fiji Football Association

References

Bibliography 
 M. Prasad, Sixty Years of Soccer in Fiji 1938 – 1998: The Official History of the Fiji Football Association, Fiji Football Association, Suva, 1998.

Football clubs in Fiji
Association football clubs established in 1960
1960 establishments in Fiji